These are the Canadian number-one albums of 2008. The chart is compiled by Nielsen Soundscan and published by Jam! Canoe, issued every Sunday. The chart also appears in Billboard magazine as Top Canadian Albums.

References

External links
Top 100 albums in Canada on Jam
Billboard Top Canadian Albums

See also
List of Hot 100 number-one singles of 2008 (Canada)

Number-one albums
Canada
2008